Archibald Brown (May 23, 1881 – December 1, 1956) was an American architect. His work was part of the architecture event in the art competition at the 1936 Summer Olympics. 
He graduated from Harvard College in 1903. He worked for the company Peabody, Wilson & Brown. His brother was politician Lathrop Brown.

References

1881 births
1956 deaths
20th-century American architects
Olympic competitors in art competitions
Architects from New York City
United States Navy officers
United States Navy personnel of World War I
United States Navy reservists
Harvard College alumni